Mayya Ezizovna Gurbanberdieva (born 9 May 1999) is a Russian synchronised swimmer.

She won a gold medal in the mixed free routine competition at the 2018 European Aquatics Championships.

Personal life 
Gurbanberdieva was born on 9 February 1999 in Moscow, Russia. Her father, Eziz Gurbanberdiýew, is from Turkmenistan and works as a news editor at the Channel One Russia television company.

References

1999 births
Living people
Russian synchronized swimmers
World Aquatics Championships medalists in synchronised swimming
Artistic swimmers at the 2019 World Aquatics Championships
European Aquatics Championships medalists in synchronised swimming
European Games medalists in synchronised swimming
European Games gold medalists for Russia
Synchronised swimmers at the 2015 European Games
Swimmers from Moscow
Ethnic Turkmen people
Russian people of Turkmenistan descent